Pope Urban X is a fictional pope created by French writer Voltaire in his 1759 novel Candide. Voltaire did this in order to avoid any consequences that would be incurred upon him, for in Candide Pope Urban X has an illegitimate child.  In Chapter 11 an old woman declares herself to be the daughter of Pope Urban X and the Princess of Palestrina.  (Voltaire was being particularly cautious, since at the time and (as of 2022) the highest numbered Pope Urban was the eighth).

An 1829 edition of Candide was the first to add a posthumous footnote by Voltaire to the page where this child is mentioned.

"Notice how exceedingly discreet our author is. There has so far been no Pope called Urban X. He hesitates to ascribe a bastard to an actual Pope. What Discretion! What a tender conscience he shows!"

This issue may have been slightly distorted in the BBC's 1973 dramatisation of Candide, where Voltaire says ironically "Observe that the name of the Pope has been chosen completely at random", which viewers may have taken as implying that this was a genuine Pope who was a womaniser. (See Play of the Month).

References

Urban 10
Candide